This is a list of awards and nominations for Brazilian director, producer and screenwriter José Padilha.

ACIE Awards

Cinema Brazil Grand Prize

Havana Film Festival

Rio de Janeiro International Film Festival

References

Padilha, Jose